Bishkek-2 is a train station located in the center of Bishkek, Kyrgyzstan. Design and construction of the building began in the 1930s. The work was completed in two years. May 1, 1938 the station was opened. Bishkek-1 railway station is located in the western part of the city, while this station is located in the city center.

Trains
 Bishkek — Moscow
 Bishkek — Novokuznetsk
 Bishkek — Shu

See also

Kyrgyz Railways
Bishkek-1 railway station

References

Railway stations in Kyrgyzstan
Railway stations opened in 1938